The posterior intermuscular septum of leg, or posterior crural intermuscular septum is a band of fascia which separates the lateral compartment of leg.

The deep fascia of leg gives off from its deep surface, on the lateral side of the leg, two strong intermuscular septa, the anterior and posterior peroneal septa, which enclose the Peronæi longus and brevis, and separate them from the muscles of the anterior and posterior crural regions, and several more slender processes which enclose the individual muscles in each region.

References

External links
 Horizontal section through the middle of the leg from www.dartmouth.edu

Muscles of the lower limb